Daniel Jay (born May 13, 1954) is a former American politician from the state of Iowa.

Jay was born in Centerville, Iowa in 1954. He graduated from Moulton-Udell Community School, (valedictorian) 1972; B.A., Drake University, (magna cum laude) 1975; J.D, Drake University Law School, 1979. He is married with three children and several grandchildren.

References

|-

1954 births
Living people
Iowa Democrats
Iowa lawyers
Drake University Law School alumni
20th-century American politicians